The MAX-80 is a personal computer released in 1982 by Lobo Systems (formerly Lobo Drives International).  It differed from other TRS-80 compatible computers in that it was not hardware compatible with the TRS-80.

Hardware

The MAX-80 featured a Zilog Z80-B CPU which ran at 5.07 MHz, a very fast speed for its time.  It came standard with 64k of memory, and was expandable via sockets for a further 64k. The standard configuration originally consisted of a 64k unit (later 128k) and CP/M.  The user could buy a complete system, or provide their own monitor and disk drives.

The floppy disk controller could handle 8 inch drives using the standard IBM 3740 format in single-sided or double-sided modes, as well as 5.25 inch floppy drives with up to 80 cylinders. The Max-80 included a hard disk interface and two RS-232 serial ports. The Max-80's character generator was user programmable.

Software

Up to 95% of TRS-80 Model III software would function without modification on the MAX-80.  This did not include games.  The special version of LDOS used was able to run most Model III programs with a patch disk available for those, such as VisiCalc, which it couldn't.  The CP/M operating system was offered as well.

A patched version of the TRS-80 Model 4's LS-DOS 6.x operating system was later made available for the Max-80. This was called MAXDOS.

Community
A users' group called MAXIMUL published a MAX-80 newsletter. MAXIMUL actually outlived Lobo Systems, lasting until 1989.

Reception
Jerry Pournelle wrote in September 1983 that if the Max-80 came with more bundled software "it would be a strong contender for the best deal in microcomputerland. As it is, it's a lot of machine for the money". He recommended that customers join Maximul.

References

External links
 Lobo MAX-80 at Oldcomputers.net
 The Lobo MAX-80 at trs-80.org
 Lobo Drives International MAX-80 at Old-Computers.com
 LDOS and Me- By Tim Mann

Z80-based home computers
Computer-related introductions in 1982